The Chemical Generation refers to a collection of writers in the 1990s who added a literary dimension to the hedonistic ecstasy culture of the era.

In its most singular guise, it could be said to include Irvine Welsh, Roddy Doyle, Alan Warner, John King, Jeff Noon, Nicholas Blincoe, Gordon Legge and Laura Hird - all of whom participated in the survey of the scene carried by the Steve Redhead book for Canongate (also publishers of Rebel Inc.), Repetitive Beat Generation.  The book's title was an attempt to draw a parallel between the ecstasy culture (singled out by government as 'repetitive beats') and the Beat generation before it.

Key works include Irvine Welsh's Ecstasy and Daren King's Boxy an Star.  The concept of a group of writers addressing drug culture was further developed in 1997 by Sarah Champion, whose Disco Biscuits became the UK's bestselling fiction anthology of all time. In addition to the authors listed above the book was notable for the inclusion of writers such as Alex Garland, Bill Drummond, Will Self, Grant Morrison, Esther Freud, Douglas Coupland, Neal Stephenson, Poppy Z. Brite and Robert Anton Wilson.

As the relevance of club culture faded with the onset of a return to guitar-based bands in the ascendancy, the writers progressed onto more staple projects, though there was an overlap with many of the writers present in 2000's New Puritans anthology.  Their style and approach have been mirrored among younger British writers however, such as Richard Milward and Michael Smith.

External links
Sarah Champion's homepage
Repetitive Beat Generation

British literary movements